Disinterest may refer to:

 Disinterest, not influenced by considerations of personal advantage. interest (emotion)
 Disinterest (album), a 1990 album by The Servants